was a Japanese swimmer. He competed in the men's 100 metre backstroke at the 1936 Summer Olympics. He was killed in action during World War II in the Battle of Okinawa.

References

External links
 

1918 births
1945 deaths
Japanese male backstroke swimmers
Olympic swimmers of Japan
Swimmers at the 1936 Summer Olympics
Sportspeople from Hiroshima
Japanese military personnel killed in World War II
Imperial Japanese Army personnel of World War II
20th-century Japanese people